Ballybeg, an anglicisation of the Irish language name Baile Beag (IPA: [bˠalˠə bʲɔɡ]) meaning "Little Town", is a fictional town in which Irish playwright Brian Friel set many of his works. Several of Friel's plays, including Philadelphia Here I Come!, Translations and Dancing at Lughnasa, are set in the fictional County Donegal town. Friel's Ballybeg is partially based on the real village of Glenties, close to where he lived.

References

County Donegal in fiction
Fictional populated places in Ireland
Works by Brian Friel